Cerithium buzzurroi is a species of sea snail, a marine gastropod mollusk in the family Cerithiidae.

Description

Distribution
The distribution of Cerithium buzzurroi includes the Western Central Pacific.
 Philippines

References

External links
 Cerithium buzzurroi at Hardy's Internet Guide to Marine Gastropods

Cerithiidae
Gastropods described in 2005